The National Museum of Art in Norway, also known simply as the National Museum, shortened NaM is a Norwegian state-owned museum in Oslo. It holds the Norwegian state's public collection of art, architecture, and design objects. The collection totals over 400.000 works, amongst them the first copy of Edvard Munch's The Scream from 1893.

The National Museum was established in 2003 by the merging of the Museum of Architecture, The Museum of Industrial Art, The Museum of contemporary Art, the Museum of Decorative Arts and Design, the Museum of Contemporary Art, and the National Gallery of Norway. In 2022, the museum opened its new building at Vestbanehallen at the centre of Oslo, housing the entirety of the collections from these previous museums.

The current director of the museum is Karen Hindsbo.

New building
A new building to house the National Museum was constructed on Vestbanen in Oslo, and opened in June 2022.

The National Gallery was closed temporarily from 13 January 2019 until the new National Museum opened. The gallery served as storage for the collections until its move to the new National Museum.  

The Museum for Contemporary Art was last open on 3 September 2017. A large portion of the collection will be shown at the new National Museum. The contemporary art will for the first time ever be presented in a collection in partnership with design, crafts, and older art. This will be the biggest and most important exhibited collection in Norway.

Exhibits will be evaluated, photographed, and conserved before they are packed away and relocated to storage, and eventually to the new museum. This is extensive work and a large part of the preparations for the new National Museum  

The Art Industry Museum closed on 16 October 2016 due to preparations for the relocation into the new National Museum.

The New National Museum at Vestbanen

In the spring of 2008 the government decided that the new building for the National Museum would be located at Vestbanen in place of the old Oslo West Station train station at Aker Brygge. It was originally planned to open in 2020. In November 2010 the German architecture company Kleihues + Schuwerk won the international architecture competition with the project Forum Artis.  

A cohesive new building was one of the preconceptions for the establishment of the National Museum in 2003. Just ten years after Norway's first public art museum was completed, the museum's administration realized the National Gallery's building was too small, other museum buildings were also in need of bigger more satisfactory premises. The same thing goes for all the exhibitions of the National Museum: Art Industry Museum, the Architecture Museum, and the Museum for Contemporary Art.

Architecture competitions for expansion at Tullinløkka were previously held in 1972 and 1995 but didn't lead to anything.  

In spring 2012 the pre-project was completed and delivered to the culture department. The government presented the project on 22 March 2013 with a price of approximately 5.3 billion Norwegian kroner. On 6 June 2013 the Stortinget decreed the new building to be within a cost frame of 5,327 billion kroner.  

The new National Museum will have an exhibition area of 13,000 m2 and will be the largest art museum in the Nordic Countries.

The National Museum and Statbygg have together established the information centre Mellomstasjonen. Up until the museum opens you can get to know the building project and the plans for the new museum, as well as participate in breakfast meetings, artist's discussions and many other things.

The building has been widely derided by critics, who have said it resembles a prison and described it as the "national prison."

Collections of the National Museum

The National Gallery

The National Gallery was established in 1842 as the Norwegian States Central Museum for Visual Arts. Since 1882 its location has been on Universitetsgata in Oslo, in a building designed by Heinrich Ernst and Adolf Schirmer. The building's exterior and interior was listed by Riksantikvaren (Cultural Heritage) in January 2012.

Art historian Jens Thiis was director of The National Gallery between 1908 and 1941.Thiis was internationally oriented and purchased a number of key works for the museum's collection. During this period, the museum also received large donations from industrial heirs Olaf Schou (1909), Christopher Paus (1918), and Chr. Langaard (1922) during this period. Paus, a relative of Henrik Ibsen who lived in Rome, amassed one of the largest collections from classical antiquity in Northern Europe, and turned down an offer from Ny Carlsberg Glyptotek to acquire the collection, instead donating it to the National Gallery where it was meant to become the foundation of a museum or department dedicated to classical antiquity.

The museum has a vast collection of Norwegian Romantic Nationalism movement paintings, as well as Edvard Munch's works. The main part of the collection of older art consists of Norwegian paintings and sculptures from the 1800s.  

Edvard Munch's Scream and some of his other renowned works are among the highlights of the National Gallery's collection. Other significant artists include J.C Dahl, Adolph Tidemand, Hans Gude, Harriet Backer, and Christian Krohg. The collection from the 20th century shows the evolution within Norwegian visual arts with references and key works from Nordic and foreign art within paintings, sculpture, photos, video and other mediums.

In 1990 the museum's collection from after 1945 was transferred to the newly established Museum of Contemporary Art.

The launch of a new basic exhibition "Everyone is Talking About the Museum" in 2005 increased visitor numbers but also had some negative reaction.

The most heavily debated decision was to divide the museum's ‘Munch Room’ and show Munch's works together with other contemporary painters. Another decision was to replace the chronological principle with a thematic one. The permanent exhibition was once again revisited in 2011. ‘The Dance of Life: Collections from the Ancients To 1950’, the Munch Room and the chronological principle has been reinstated. The new permanent exhibition has been praised as ‘a short version of the world’s art history instead of a revisit of the museum’s own collection’.

Graphics and drawing collection

The museum's extensive graphic and drawing collection includes almost 50,000 Norwegian and foreign works, and spans from the end of the 1400s to current day. Central artists include Durer, Rembrandt, Van Gogh, Goya, Picasso, Manet, Rafael, Rubens, Muncb, Tidemand, Dahl, Werenskiold, and Kittelsen. Newer Norwegian graphics and drawn art is also well represented.

Museum for Contemporary Art (1990-2017) 

The Museum for Contemporary Art was established in 1988 and was located at Bankplassen 4 in Oslo. The collection consisted of works from the former National Exhibition and National Gallery, including later purchases. The 1907 museum building, designed by Ingvar Hjorth, formerly housed the Norwegian Bank. The museum opened for the public in 1990 and became a part of the National Museum in 2003.

The museum had alternating exhibitions in the 2000 m large2 facilities. In and outside the museum installations by the artists Per Inge Bjørlo, Inner Space VS. the Goal (1990) and the gallery room was dedicated to Louise Bourgeois. The collection consisted of over 5000 Norwegian and foreign works from the period of 1945 to the 21st century. Known Norwegian artists within the collection were Anna-Eva Bergman, Leonard Rickhard, Bjarne Melgaard, and Marianne Heske. Known international artists include Mario Merz, Cindy Sherman, Ilya Kabakov, and Isaac Julien. The collection was continually expanded with yearly purchases of art work.  

The Museum of Contemporary Art closed its doors in September 2017, and the contemporary art collection was moved to the new National Museum which opened in June 2022.

National Museum – Architecture

The Architecture Museum was established by the Norwegian Architects National Association in 1975 and became a part of the National Museum 1 July 2003. The building on Kongens Gate 4 was in use up until March 2005. The museum renamed the National Museum – Architecture, opened in 2008 at a new location, Bankplassen 3 in Oslo.

The museum is located in three separate buildings that are built together. The main building – the oldest section – was the Norges Banks Christianiaavdeling which was designed by Christian H. Grosch and was finished in 1830. Diagonally behind is Sverre Fehns addition from 2002 – the Ulltveit-Moe Pavilion. There is also a storage building from 1911, designed by Henry Bucher.

National Museum – Architecture shows alternating exhibits from the collection that consists of models, drawing, and photographs.  The National Museum has Norway's most important architecture collection, featuring more than 300,000 items dated from the 1830s to current day. The collection highlights and documents different aspects of architectural culture and is mainly made up of private archives or fragments of archives. These span over a large variation of materials and mediums: architectural drawings, photographs, models, conceptual studies, sketchbooks, correspondences and ephemera. The collection's main focus is the 1900s, and names within Norwegian architectural history such as Ove Bang, Blakstad of Munthe, Jan & Jon, Knut Knutsen, Arne Korsmo, Christian Norberg-Schulz, Magnus Poulsson, and Erling Viksjø are well represented. Pritzker Prize winner Sverre Fehns is a highlights of the collection.

Art Industry Museum

The Art Industry Museum is located at St. Olavs gate 1. The building was constructed in 1902 after Kristiania County decided, in 1896, to construct a new building at the then Brandt løkke, on the corner of Ullevålsveien and St. Olavs gate. In 1897 they had an architecture competition, and of the 14 proposals the 26-year old architect Adolf Brendo Greve was declared the winner. Due to his young age he asked the more experienced Ingvar Hjorth for assistance.

The museum itself was created by the initiative of professor Lorentz Dietrichson and antiquarian Nicolay Nicolaysen in 1876, and the museum was founded by the country that same year. That makes the museum amongst the first in Norway and one of the earliest art industry museums in Europe. This initiative was most likely based on the newly founded state of Norway's need to show themselves as an independent and individual nation.
The collection of designs and handicrafts ranges from ancient Greek vases and East Asian artefacts to European style history. It includes costume, fashion and textiles, furniture, silver, glass, ceramics, design and crafts. The unique Baldishol rug from the 12th century, the royal costume collection, Nøstetangen glass, Norwegian silver and Herrebøe faience are among the highlights.

Due to preparations for moving to the new National Museum, the Museum of Art and Design closed on 16 October 2016. The collection will be part of the new National Museum, which opens in 2020.

National Exhibitions

This was established in 1953 as a government agency under the culture department, to send travelling exhibitions of Norwegian and Nordic art to other parts of the country. The agency sent out 142 exhibitions in the 34 years it existed. The National Exhibition built up their own collections, as well as borrowed works for their exhibits. The main aim and motto is ‘Art to the People’.

When the Museum for Contemporary Art was established in 1988, the National Gallery became a part of the museum, from 1992 with the name ‘Riksutstillinger’(National Exhibitions).

The National Exhibitions The national exhibitions were a national art communication, whose task was to create interest and understanding of visual arts, crafts, photography, design and architecture. It was a national competence centre for dissemination, exhibition technique and design. National Exhibitions had five departments: administration, programme, dissemination, information, and department for exhibition design.  

From 1992 to 2005 it also had the function of organizing exhibitions outside the usual – such as large exhibitions from other continents (Saana Africa (Art from South-Africa), Fråvær (Absence), Vietnam Express, etc.). From 2005 the National Exhibition was disbanded, its dissemination responsibility transferred to Landsdekkende (Nationwide) Program, a part of the National Museum for Art, Architecture, and Design.

Selected collection highlights

Conflicts 
From the beginning, the National Museum was marked by conflicts, both on an administrative, artistic and political level. The first director of the National Museum was Swedish Sune Nordgren (until August 2006). Nordgren resigned as director after a long period of professional criticism and staff conflicts at the museum. On 1 August 2007, Allis Helleland took over as the new director. Under her leadership, the conflicts at the museum persisted, and Helleland was subjected to criticism both from employees at the museum and from the professional circles outside. She retired on August 11, 2008. The board appointed Ingar Pettersen as general manager. The museum's chairman of the board since the beginning, Christian Bjelland, resigned his position later that autumn, and was replaced by Svein Aaser.
The director from 2009 till 2017 was Audun Eckhoff, who was succeeded by Karin Hindsbo.

National Museum’s Objectives 
Purchases and presents

Collection work, purchases and donations to the collection are important aspects of the museum's community responsibilities. The museum builds and completes the collections mainly through current national and international organizations. There is a specific focus to gather important works with for a specific artist, period, group, or area of the collection within the collections policy.

Preservation

One of the museum's most important tasks is making sure the art works within the collection are kept in as good a state as possible. Conservators treat, document, and research the museum's collection of painting, paper, textiles, artwork and design, installations and electronic mediums. An important part of the conservator's work is to investigate and document the condition of works in connection with loans, exhibitions or purchases.

Research and development

Research and development are part of the museum's core tasks. This activity springs out of and is partly integrated in the museum's artistic activities. The research must be of a high level and up to international standards. During 2010 the current research policies were reevaluated and a long-term plan of action was formed.

Published Research

An important form of dissemination of research that takes place in the National Museum is publication. In addition to the yearbook Architecture in Norway and the magazine Kunst og Kultur , the National Museum publishes annual catalogs related to the exhibitions and the collections. The museum's professionals are also contributors to many other different publications. Supplementary information about the individual publication can be found in databases available via the National Museum's library and in the overview of publications published by the National Museum.

Kunst og kultur (Arts and Culture)

Norway's only scientific journal within art history, Kunst og kultur, Art and Culture is published by the National Museum in collaboration with Universitetsforlaget (The University Press). The purpose of Kunst og kultur is to publish peer-reviewed articles within Norwegian and international art history and current book reviews. Its main subjects are art, crafts, design, and architecture from any period.  

National Museum's research library

The museum's research library includes approximately 165,000 books, exhibition catalogues, and encyclopedias within older and newer visual arts, crafts, design, architecture, and adjacent areas. The library has c. 200 journal titles, a video/DVD collection, and a collection of c. 28,000 slides. The library's collection can be accessed at the library's premises at Kristian Augusts gate 23.

Archive Collections

The National Museum's archive collections consist of extensive documentation and research material. The collections contain archives by public and private actors, as well as a broad documentation of Norwegian artists and the museum's own art collections. The archives are available to anyone interested in the library's reading room.

Media Archive

The National Museum's archive collections contain an extensive collection of newspaper clippings. The collection is based on a systematic collection of newspaper clippings mainly from the post-war period until today. Parts of the collection date back to the 19th century. The material can be used in the library's reading room
  

Digital commitment

The museum performs digitisation work of the collections, through the medium of DigitaltMuseum and Google Art Project, which can be accessed online. In the digital archive you can search through 35,000 works and 5,000 artists, architects, and designers.

Organisation

The National Museum is run by the foundation Nasjonalmuseet for Kunst (National Museum of Art), which was created by the culture and church department of the government on 28 April 2003. The foundation is managed by a board with seven members, whereof three, including the leader, are chosen by the state. The board hires a daily manager for a fixed term and decides their work requirements and paycheck. The daily manager is in charge of the day-to-day work the foundation does in relation to guidelines given by the board.

Directors 

 Sune Nordgren (2003–2006), 
 Anne Kjellberg (acting, 2006–2007), 
 Allis Helleland (2007–2008), 
 Ingar Pettersen (acting, 2008–2009), 
 Audun Eckhoff (2009–2017) and 
 Karin Hindsbo (2017–present)

See also
 List of national galleries

References

External links
 
New National Museum project description
Virtual tour of the National Museum of Art provided by Google Arts & Culture

2003 establishments in Norway
Art museums established in 2003
Art museums and galleries in Norway
Architecture museums
Architecture in Norway
Museums in Oslo
Design museums